The Premio internazionale Giacinto Facchetti – Il bello del calcio ("Giacinto Facchetti International Award – The beauty of football") is a recognition established in 2006 awarded annually to a football personality for their fair play and sportsmanship by the Milan-based Italian sports newspaper La Gazzetta dello Sport.

History
The prize was conceived in 2006 by the newspaper's former director Candido Cannavò and the newspaper's director at the time Carlo Verdelli, in honour of the late Italy and Internazionale defender Giacinto Facchetti, following his death earlier that year on 4 September. The distinction is awarded annually to a football personality who has stood out for their  fair play and sportsmanship.

Winners

References

See also
Premio Nazionale Carriera Esemplare "Gaetano Scirea"

Awards established in 2006
2006 establishments in Italy
Association football trophies and awards
Italian football trophies and awards
European football trophies and awards
Sportsmanship trophies and awards
Awards by newspapers